Eagle Island is about 200 metres from Eagle Bluff on the Peron Peninsula in Shark Bay World Heritage Site in the Gascoyne region of Western Australia.

It is a sand island with an area of about 1000 square metres (11000 ft2), and an elevation of eight metres (26 ft).

The island's vegetation is a closed heath, of which the dominant plant species is Nitraria billardierei (nitre bush). Other plant species include Limonium salicorniaceum; Sporobulus virginicus; species of Calandrinia, Pelargonium, Poa and Selenothamnus; and an introduced species of Chenopodium. silver gulls nest on the island, and a small number of pied cormorants roost there.

See also
 List of islands of Western Australia

References
 Eagle Island in the Gazetteer of Australia online
 

Islands of Shark Bay